was a Japanese samurai, geographer and explorer.

Mogami was born in Dewa Province which is now part of Yamagata Prefecture).

He explored and mapped Hokkaido and Sakhalin and some of the Kuril Islands in 1785–1786. In his reports to the Tokugawa shogunate, he emphasized the need to defend the islands. He compiled a preliminary Ainu-Japanese dictionary in Ezo Soshi.

Selected works
In a statistical overview derived from writings by and about Mogami Tokunai, OCLC/WorldCat encompasses roughly 20+ works in 40+ publications in 3 languages and 130+ library holdings.

蝦夷草紙 (1790)
蝦夷國風俗人情之沙汰 (1791)
蝦夷方言藻汐草 (1804)
度量衡統 (1804)

Notes

References
最上徳内 150年祭実行委員会 (Mogami Tokunai Sesquicentennial Committee). (1987). 最上徳内の遺徳を偲ぶ: 百五十年祭記念誌 (Mogami Tokunai no itoku o shinobu: hyaku-gojūnensai kinenshi. OCLC  022705749
Nussbaum, Louis-Frédéric and Käthe Roth. (2005).  Japan encyclopedia. Cambridge: Harvard University Press. ;  OCLC 58053128

External links
 Ezo Soshi

1755 births
1836 deaths
Deified Japanese people